Greece was represented by 24 athletes at the 2012 European Athletics Championships held in Helsinki, Finland, from 26 June 2012 until 1 July 2012.

Medals

Results

Men
Track

Field

Women
Track

Field

Combined

References

Nations at the 2012 European Athletics Championships
2012
European Athletics Championships